The Kansas City Royals are a Major League Baseball (MLB) team based in Kansas City, Missouri. They currently play in the American League Central.

The first game of a new baseball season for a team is known as Opening Day. The Opening Day starting pitcher is often given to the pitcher who is expected to lead the team's pitching staff for that season, though there are strategic reasons why a team's best pitcher might not start on Opening Day. The Kansas City Royals have used 25 different Opening Day starting pitchers in their 52 seasons. The 23 starters have a combined Opening Day record of 14 wins, 22 losses and 16 no decisions. No decisions are only awarded to the starting pitcher if the game is won or lost after the starting pitcher has left the game.

The Kansas City Royals began play in 1969. Wally Bunker was the Royals’ first Opening Day starting pitcher on April 8, 1969, against the Minnesota Twins. The Royals have played in two home ball parks. They played in Municipal Stadium from 1969 through 1972. They played three Opening Day games at Municipal Stadium, winning twice and losing once. The Royals’ starting pitchers received no decisions in both of the wins, leaving their record in Opening Day starts at Municipal Stadium no wins, one loss, and two no decisions. In 1973, the team moved to Royals Stadium (later renamed to Kauffman Stadium in 1993). They have played 24 Opening Day games in the stadium, with starting pitchers having ten wins, ten losses, and four no decisions. On the other hand, the Royals have played 25 Opening Day games on the road. Starting pitchers have a combined record of four wins, thirteen losses, and eight no decisions for road games.

Kevin Appier has most Opening Day starts for the Royals, with seven, including six consecutive start from 1992 to 1997. He has a record of 1–4 with two no decisions in those starts. The other Royal pitchers who have made at least three Opening Day starts are Dennis Leonard with four, and Paul Splittorff, Bud Black, Bret Saberhagen, Jeff Suppan, Gil Meche, and Danny Duffy with three apiece.  Bunker, Dick Drago, Steve Busby, Larry Gura and James Shields have each made two Opening Day starts for the Royals.

Black, who has two wins as an Opening Day starting pitcher, is the only Royals pitcher who has won more than one Opening Day start. Black had a record in Opening Day starts of 2–1. Only two Royals pitchers had more than one loss in Opening Day starts, Kevin Appier with four losses and Dennis Leonard with three.

The Royals played in the World Series in 1980, 1985, 2014 and 2015, winning in 1985 and 2015. Leonard, Black, Shields and Ventura were the Opening Day starting pitchers in 1980, 1985, 2014 and 2015 respectively. They combined to have a Opening Day record of 2–1 with one no decision.

Key

Pitchers

References

Opening day starters
Lists of Major League Baseball Opening Day starting pitchers